Neolamprologus prochilus is a species of cichlid endemic to Lake Tanganyika, where it is only known to occur in Zambian waters in the southern part of the lake. This species can reach a length of  TL.

References

prochilus
Fauna of Zambia
Fish described in 1977
Taxonomy articles created by Polbot